McDougall is a township in central Ontario, Canada, on the Parry Sound in the District of Parry Sound. It was named after William McDougall, one of the Fathers of Confederation.

In 2000, the Township of McDougall amalgamated with the unorganized geographic township of Ferguson, and created the Municipality of McDougall.

Communities
The township comprises the communities of Badger's Corners, Nobel, and Waubamik.

Demographics

Mother tongue:
 English as first language: 93.3%
 French as first language: 1.5%
 English and French as first language: 0.6%
 Other as first language: 4.6%

See also
List of townships in Ontario

References

External links

1872 establishments in Ontario
Municipalities in Parry Sound District
Single-tier municipalities in Ontario
Township municipalities in Ontario